FAS-associated factor 1 is a protein that in humans is encoded by the FAF1 gene.

Interaction of Fas ligand (TNFSF6) with the FAS antigen (TNFRSF6) mediates programmed cell death, also called apoptosis, in a number of organ systems. The protein encoded by this gene binds to FAS antigen and can initiate apoptosis or enhance apoptosis initiated through FAS antigen. Initiation of apoptosis by the protein encoded by this gene requires a ubiquitin-like domain but not the FAS-binding domain.

References

Further reading